= Coco County =

Coco County is a nickname of two counties in the United States:

- Coconino County, Arizona
- Contra Costa County, California
